Established in St. Louis in 1899 by A.L.Dyke (Andrew Lee Dyke), Dyke was the first American auto parts business. Dyke also sold early autos, kit car or assembled.  In addition to the Dyke name, the company also sold automobiles under the St. Louis (St. Louis Motor Company) and Dyke-Britton names.

References

External links
 https://web.archive.org/web/20151219005452/http://www.virtualsteamcarmuseum.org/makers/dyke_steam_carriage.html
 https://www.lib.uchicago.edu/e/scrc/findingaids/view.php?eadid=ICU.SPCL.CRMS307
 http://dorrismotors.wikidot.com/andrew-lee-dyke

Books by Andrew Lee Dyke

 Diseases of a gasolene automobile and how to cure them(1903)
 THE ANATOMY OF THE AUTOMOBILE (1904)
 Dyke's Automobile Encyclopedia In 40 Parts Including a Dictionary, Index and 175 Charts Treating On Construction, Operation, 
 Repairing of Automobiles and Gasoline Engines(1912)
 Text book for Dyke's home study course of automobile engineering(1919)
 Dyke's aircraft engine instructor: Third-run with additions(1929)
 Dyke's Automobile and Gasoline Engine Encyclopedia by A.L. Dyke and Illustrated, GOODHEART WILLCOX & CO, (1937, 1946)

Brass Era vehicles
Defunct motor vehicle manufacturers of the United States
Defunct manufacturing companies based in Missouri
1900s cars
Manufacturing companies based in St. Louis
American companies established in 1899
Vehicle manufacturing companies established in 1899
1899 establishments in Missouri